The BICh-26   was a tailless jet fighter designed in the Soviet Union from 1947.

Development 
After the close of World War II, Boris Cheranovsky was running a de facto design bureau working on jet fighter aircraft. Not only was Cheranovsky involved with jet propulsion, he also studied variable geometry with the BICh-24 and BICh-25, which were designed with variable sweep wings pivoting outboard of the fuselage to help alleviate centre of pressure changes. Also envisaged was a stressed skin light alloy tailless jet fighter with powered flying controls and pressurised cockpit, designated BICh-26. Cheranovsky's failing health from 1948 prevented further progress on these projects.

Variants 
 BICh-24 – Variable sweep jet fighter project.
 BICh-25 – Variable sweep jet fighter project.
 BICh-26 – Tail-less jet fighter project.

Specifications (BICh-26)

References

 Gunston, Bill. “The Osprey Encyclopaedia of Russian Aircraft 1875–1995”. London, Osprey. 1995. 

1950s Soviet fighter aircraft
BICh-26
Tailless delta-wing aircraft
Blended wing body